The Tripura Janasiksha Samiti is an organisation in the Indian state of Tripura which was created to setup schools and spread education among the children of the down-trodden people of that state. It was formed on 27 December 1945.

At that time, the movement of the Janasiksha Samiti speedily transformed into a mass movement. The Samiti could establish 488 primary schools in different remote areas of the state with the active co-operation, financial help and labour of the mass people. Subsequently, in 1950–51, most of these schools were recognised by the State Government. The Samiti also published the first Kokborok Magazine "Kwtal Kothoma" in 1954 AD under Sudhanwa Debbarma.

References 

Organisations based in Tripura
Education in Tripura
Kokborok
West Tripura district
Organizations established in 1945
1945 establishments in India